Henry Wiencek (born 1952) is an American journalist, historian and editor whose work has encompassed historically significant architecture, the Founding Fathers, various topics relating to slavery, and the Lego company. In 1999, The Hairstons: An American Family in Black and White, a biographical history which chronicles the racially intertwined Hairston clan of the noted Cooleemee Plantation House, won the National Book Critics Circle Award
for biography.

Wiencek has come to be particularly associated with his work on George Washington and slavery as a result of his book, An Imperfect God: George Washington, His Slaves, and the Creation of America, which earned him the Los Angeles Times Book Award for history. Partly as a result of this book, Wiencek was named the first-ever Washington College Patrick Henry Fellow, inaugurating a program designed to provide writing fellowships for nationally prominent historians.

In 2003, Wiencek was appointed to the board of trustees for the Library of Virginia.

In June 2010, Texas A&M University Press released The Moodys of Galveston and Their Mansion, a history of the prominent Galveston family and their celebrated home. Wiencek originally compiled the manuscript after the Moody Mansion opened to the public as a museum, education center, and location for community gatherings in 1991.

Early life and education
Wiencek was born and raised in Dorchester, Massachusetts. He attended Boston College High School, where he was valedictorian. He earned an undergraduate degree from Yale University in 1974 with a double major in Russian Literature and Literary Theory.

Career
Soon after graduating, Wiencek moved to New York City, where he worked for Time-Life, editing and writing for its publications.

Personal life 
Wiencek is married to Donna M. Lucey, who is also an American historian. Wiencek has resided in Charlottesville, Virginia since 1992, where he works in his home.  
He and his wife spent the 2008-2009 academic year in residence in a restored colonial house at Chestertown, Maryland in fulfillment of his Patrick Henry Fellowship duties.

Bibliography

The Moodys of Galveston and Their Mansion, 2010
 An Imperfect God: George Washington, His Slaves, and the Creation of America, 2003
 The Hairstons: An American Family in Black and White, 1999
 National Geographic Guide to America's Great Houses, 1999
 Virginia & the Capital Region Smithsonian Guides (Smithsonian Guides to Historic America), 1998
 Smithsonian Guides to Historic America: Southern New England - Massachusetts, Connecticut, Rhode Island (Smithsonian Guides to Historic America), 1998
 Old Houses, 1995
 Plantations of the Old South (Great American Homes), 1990
 The Smithsonian Guide to Historic America - Southern New England (The Smithsonian guide to historic America), 1989
 World of Lego Toys, 1987
 The Lords of Japan (Treasures of The World), 1982

References

External links
 
 Review of An Imperfect God
 

21st-century American historians
21st-century American male writers
Historians of the United States
Yale College alumni
Living people
1952 births
Writers from Charlottesville, Virginia
Writers from Boston
Writers from New York City
Boston College High School alumni
Historians from Massachusetts
Historians from New York (state)
Historians from Virginia
American male non-fiction writers